Vugar Rasulov (born 5 April 1991) is an Azerbaijani chess Grandmaster.

Biography
Vugar Rasulov repeatedly represented Azerbaijan at the European Youth Chess Championships and World Youth Chess Championships in different age groups, where he won two medals: gold (in 2007, at the European Youth Chess Championship in the U16 age group) and bronze (in 2006, at the European Youth Chess Championship in the U16 age group). In 2006, he played for Azerbaijan in World Youth U16 Chess Olympiad. Vugar Rasulov is multiple winner of Azerbaijani Youth Chess Championships in different age groups, including two consecutive winners in U20 age group (2010, 2011). In 2009, he shared third place in Azerbaijani Chess Championship.

Vugar Rasulov is winner of many international chess tournaments, including winning or first prize in Isfahan (2011), and in Çanakkale chess festival Troya Festival (2014).

In 2009, he was awarded the FIDE International Master (IM) title and received the FIDE Grandmaster (GM) title two years later.

References

External links

Vugar Rasulov chess games at 365Chess.com

1991 births
Sportspeople from Ganja, Azerbaijan
Living people
Azerbaijani chess players
Chess grandmasters